Père Louis Gaillard (1850–1900) was a 19th-century French sinologist and Jesuit missionary who studied notably Nankin, Shandong (Yantai), Guangdong (Pearl River) and more generally China.

Bibliography

External links 

 Etudes d'art chinois : Le dessin en Chine / Louis Gaillard

French sinologists
French Roman Catholic missionaries
19th-century French Jesuits
1850 births
1900 deaths
Jesuit missionaries in China
French expatriates in China